The Angelo State Rams football team represents Angelo State University in NCAA Division II college football. The Rams compete in the South Division of the Lone Star Conference. Angelo State has earned one national title and three conference titles since becoming a member of the Lone Star Conference. The team plays all home games at LeGrand Stadium at 1st Community Credit Union Field. Jeff Girsch is currently the head coach.

Head coaches

Playoff appearances

NCAA Division II 
The Rams have made eight appearances in the NCAA Division II playoffs. Their combined record is 7–8.

NAIA
The Rams made three appearances in the NAIA playoffs. Their combined record was 4-2, with a national championship in 1978.

Rams who have played in the NFL

 Jerry Aldridge
 Chris Brazzell
 Rod Cason
 Bobby Clatterbuck
 Shockmain Davis
 Alvin Garrett
 Shawn Hollingsworth
 Pierce Holt
 Ken Kennard
 Dane Krager
 Andre President
 Wylie Turner
 Clayton Weishuhn
 Charlie West

References

External links